Monica, O My Darling is a 2022 Hindi-language neo-noir crime comedy thriller film directed by Vasan Bala. The film stars Rajkummar Rao, Huma Qureshi and Radhika Apte. The movie was adapted from the 1989 Japanese novel Burutasu No Shinzou (Eng: Heart of Brutus) by Keigo Higashino. The film's title is taken from the 1971 film Caravans song "Piya Tu Ab To Aja". It released on 11 November 2022 on Netflix.

Upon release, it received positive reviews from critics and became the most-viewed film in Netflix.

Plot 
During a night shift at the Unicorn factory, Dev Prakash informs his friend Gaurav that he has proposed marriage to Shalu and she has accepted. Soon after, the company's robot attacks and kills Dev. The case is closed as an accident while safety officer Faridi Baig is fired from the company.

6 months later, at the Unicorn's 50th anniversary, Jayant Arkhedkar is promoted to the board of directors for the company. He is also engaged to the daughter of the CEO Satyanarayan Adhikari, Nikki Adhikari. After the ceremony, he is shown to be having an affair with the company's secretary Monica Machado. Monica reveals to Jayant that she is pregnant with his child and tries to blackmail him. Later, Jayant receives a letter with photos of him and Monica, asking him to visit a hotel. In the hotel, he meets up with Arvind Manivannan, the CFO at Unicorn, and Nishikant Adhikari, the son of Satyanarayan and the Managing Director, both of whom also claim to have been blackmailed by Monica with her pregnancy. All three of them devise a plan to murder Monica, with Nishikant killing her, Jayant transporting the body, and Arvind disposing of the body. Nishikant has them sign a contract as failsafe in case Arvind and Jayant back out of the plan at the last moment. The plan appears to be on track until Arvind and Jayant encounter a leopard while trying to dump the body in the jungle, and have to flee.

The next day, Arvind and Jayant are shocked to see that Monica is still alive. Wildlife photographers discover the body disposed in the wild, which turns out to be of Nishikant. ACP Naidu of the police begins to investigate the death at Unicorn office, while both Arvind and Jayant suspect that Monica is the one who killed Nishikant. Arvind later receives a parcel at his home containing a venomous snake, which ends up killing him. Jayant receives a similar parcel but manages to escape, and receives a text with a photo of their contract. Jayant follows the text instructions and goes to the roof to retrieve the contract but he is pushed from behind by Gaurav (Jayant's friend and to-be brother-in-law). He survives and manages to get the contract, only to discover that it is a photocopy. Jayant visits Monica's house where he tries to kill her, but stops after a bout of conscience. Monica tells him that she didn't kill Nishikant or Arvind and seems to have figured out who the murderer is. Before she can tell Jayant, she dies from snake venom that has been mixed into her wine.

Later, Jayant discovers that the internal investigation into Dev's death had blamed Jayant's faulty robot technology, but Satyanarayan covered it up and had Faridi fired instead. When Jayant meets Faridi to apologize, Faridi insists that Dev wasn't killed by accident, but was rather murdered by manual override of the robot's controls. Jayant and Gaurav together go to the Unicorn factory to check the manual access logs of the robot that killed Dev. Jayant discovers that it was Gaurav who killed Dev, as he was in love with Jayant's sister Shalu. Gaurav attacks Jayant with the same robot. During the fight, Gaurav confesses to killing Nishikant and Arvind, but not Monica. Nishikant saw Dev's murder by Gaurav and started using Gaurav as his minion. But when Nishikant asked Gaurav to murder Monica or he would expose him to Shalu, he snapped and murdered Nishi. And subsequently, set out to clean house including killing Jayant. After some struggle, Jayant is finally able to take control of the robot with his watch and kills Gaurav in self-defense. Later, Naidu announces at a press conference that Monica's killer was Tamang Rana, the father of her unborn child, who has committed suicide due to guilt he felt for Monica's murder.

During the prayer ceremony for Monica, Naidu reveals to Jayant that the actual father of Monica's child was Satyanarayan. He had Tamang poison Monica's wine after she started blackmailing Satyanarayan, and then had Naidu murder Tamang to silence him. Jayant later goes to Gaurav's house to retrieve the original contract, but as soon as he discovers the paper and burns it, he is surrounded by the snakes which Gaurav had stolen, and the screen turns to black leaving his fate unknown.

Cast

Soundtrack 

The first song in this film is titled "Yeh Ek Zindagi" sung by Anupama Chakraborty Shrivastava, composed by Achint Thakkar and Mikey McCleary and lyrics by Varun Grover.  Released on 1 November 2022.

Production 
Production began in July 2021.

Release 
The film released on 11 November 2022 on Netflix.

Reception 
Monica, O My Darling received positive reviews from critics who praised the direction, writing, cast performances (particularly Rajkummar Rao, Huma Qureshi and Radhika Apte), cinematography, humour, background score, and homages to the vintage crime films in Hindi cinema. However, some critics were critical of the film's latter half.

Critical reception 
Zinia Bandyopadhyay of India Today rated the film 4 out of 5 stars and wrote "The frames of the film are beautiful. It will make you just pause and watch them again and again. And the background music heightens the impact that the narrative has. So long after the film has ended, it will still remain in your hearts". Anna M. M. Vetticad of Firstpost praised the acting and music of the film but was critical of the community representation, saying "It is troubling though that thinking folk casually wrote a Monica Machado into this script as an office staffer doubling up as a cabaret dancer and also sleeping with everyone in sight, a resurrection of the pre-1990s Hindi film portrayal of Christian women, without recognising the harm that has been done to India's Christian minority by this old stereotype." The Indian Express gave the film a positive response and declared "Relax, Bollywood is doing just fine; you're not looking in the right places". Saibal Chatterjee of NDTV rated the film 4 stars out of 5 and called it "An intriguing, enthralling work that deftly turns pulp into a precious cinematic pearl. In short, it is a not-to-be-missed marvel". Pratikshya Mishra of The Quint rated the film 3.5 stars out of 5 and wrote "In summary, Monica O My Darling is an intriguing story set in a delicious pulpy universe with a great cast. With a tighter edit and a more concise story, the film would've been almost impossible to put down (but even as it stands, it's a fun watch)".

References

External links 
 

Indian neo-noir films
Indian crime comedy-drama films
2022 films
Hindi-language Netflix original films
Films based on Japanese novels
Films based on works by Keigo Higashino